The 1923 Trinity Blue Devils team was an American football team that represented Trinity College (later renamed Duke University) as an independent during the 1923 college football season. In its first and only season under head coach E. L. Alexander, the team compiled a 5–4 record and outscored opponents by a total of 211 to 104. Jimmy Simpson was the team captain.

Schedule

References

Trinity
Duke Blue Devils football seasons
Trinity Blue Devils football